A Healthy Distrust is the second solo studio album by American rapper Sage Francis. It was released on Epitaph Records in 2005. It peaked at number 12 on Billboards Heatseekers Albums chart, as well as number 17 on the Independent Albums chart.

Critical reception

At Metacritic, which assigns a weighted average score out of 100 to reviews from mainstream critics, the album received an average score of 78, based on 26 reviews, indicating "generally favorable reviews".

Brian Howe of Pitchfork gave the album an 8.0 out of 10, saying, "On A Healthy Distrust, Francis continues to refine his contradictory blend of trash talk and activism, political polemic and introspection, pedantic bluster and profound insecurity." Stefan Braidwood of PopMatters gave the album 8 stars out of 10, saying, "A Healthy Distrust bears up effortlessly to the demands of both casual entertainment and prolonged, thoughtful analysis." Ron Hart of Billboard called it "[Sage Francis'] most impressive album yet." Michael Bennett of Stylus Magazine gave the album a grade of B, saying, "A Healthy Distrusts production and wordplay have improved to such a large degree that it's hard to believe that it could happen again on the next outing."

Track listing

Personnel
Credits adapted from liner notes.

 Sage Francis – vocals, recording, executive production
 Reanimator – production (1, 8, 12, 14)
 Alias – production (2, 4, 5), guitar (10), drums (10)
 Danger Mouse – production (3)
 Joe Beats – production (6)
 Daddy Kev – production (7)
 Controller 7 – production (9)
 Sixtoo – production (10, 11)
 Varick Pyr – production (13)
 Will Oldham – vocals (2), guitar (2)
 Tom Inhaler – guitar (15)
 Nathan H. – harmonica (15)
 Chris Warren – engineering, mixing
 Gene Grimaldi – mastering

Charts

References

External links
 
 

2005 albums
Sage Francis albums
Epitaph Records albums
Albums produced by Alias (musician)
Albums produced by Danger Mouse (musician)
Albums produced by Daddy Kev